Bujoru ("peony") may refer to several places in Romania:

Bujoru, Teleorman
Bujoru, a village in Dobra Commune, Hunedoara County
Bujoru, a village in Călmățuiu Commune, Teleorman County
Bujoru River
Traian Vuia, Timiș, called Bujoru until 1950